Zhu Pengkai (born March 21, 1987) is a Paralympian athlete from China competing mainly in category F12 javelin events.

Zhu had to pull out of the pentathlon in the 2008 Summer Paralympics in his home country, but he did manage to win the F11/12 javelin gold medal in front of the home fans.

External links
 

1987 births
Paralympic athletes of China
Athletes (track and field) at the 2008 Summer Paralympics
Paralympic gold medalists for China
Living people
Chinese male javelin throwers
Chinese male modern pentathletes
Medalists at the 2008 Summer Paralympics
Athletes (track and field) at the 2012 Summer Paralympics
Athletes (track and field) at the 2016 Summer Paralympics
Medalists at the 2012 Summer Paralympics
Paralympic medalists in athletics (track and field)
Athletes (track and field) at the 2020 Summer Paralympics
21st-century Chinese people